Xen (pronounced ) is a type-1 hypervisor, providing services that allow multiple computer operating systems to execute on the same computer hardware concurrently. It was
originally developed by the University of Cambridge Computer Laboratory and is now being developed by the Linux Foundation with support from Intel, Citrix, Arm Ltd, Huawei, AWS, Alibaba Cloud, AMD, Bitdefender and epam.

The Xen Project community develops and maintains Xen Project as free and open-source software, subject to the requirements of the GNU General Public License (GPL), version 2. Xen Project is currently available for the IA-32, x86-64 and ARM instruction sets.

Software architecture 
Xen Project runs in a more privileged CPU state than any other software on the machine, except for Firmware.

Responsibilities of the hypervisor include memory management and CPU scheduling of all virtual machines ("domains"), and for launching the most privileged domain ("dom0") - the only virtual machine which by default has direct access to hardware. From the dom0 the hypervisor can be managed and unprivileged domains ("domU") can be launched.

The dom0 domain is typically a version of Linux or BSD. User domains may either be traditional operating systems, such as Microsoft Windows under which privileged instructions are provided by hardware virtualization instructions (if the host processor supports x86 virtualization, e.g., Intel VT-x and AMD-V), or paravirtualized operating systems whereby the operating system is aware that it is running inside a virtual machine, and so makes hypercalls directly, rather than issuing privileged instructions.

Xen Project boots from a bootloader such as GNU GRUB, and then usually loads a paravirtualized host operating system into the host domain (dom0).

History 

Xen originated as a research project at the University of Cambridge led by Ian Pratt, a senior lecturer in the Computer Laboratory, and his PhD student Keir Fraser. The first public release of Xen was made in 2003, with v1.0 following in 2004. Soon after, Pratt and Fraser along with other Cambridge alumni including Simon Crosby and founding CEO Nick Gault created XenSource Inc. to turn Xen into a competitive enterprise product.

To support embedded systems such as smartphone/ IoT with relatively scarce hardware computing resources, the Secure Xen ARM architecture on an ARM CPU was exhibited at Xen Summit on April 17, 2007, held in IBM TJ Watson. The first public release of Secure Xen ARM source code was made at Xen Summit on June 24, 2008 by Sang-bum Suh, a Cambridge alumnus, in Samsung Electronics.

On October 22, 2007, Citrix Systems completed its acquisition of XenSource, and the Xen Project moved to the xen.org domain. This move had started some time previously, and made public the existence of the Xen Project Advisory Board (Xen AB), which had members from Citrix, IBM, Intel, Hewlett-Packard, Novell, Red Hat, Sun Microsystems and Oracle. The Xen Advisory Board advises the Xen Project leader and is responsible for the Xen trademark, which Citrix has freely licensed to all vendors and projects that implement the Xen hypervisor. Citrix also used the Xen brand itself for some proprietary products unrelated to Xen, including XenApp and XenDesktop.

On April 15, 2013, it was announced that the Xen Project was moved under the auspices of the Linux Foundation as a Collaborative Project. The Linux Foundation launched a new trademark for "Xen Project" to differentiate the project from any commercial use of the older "Xen" trademark. A new community website was launched at xenproject.org as part of the transfer. Project members at the time of the announcement included: Amazon, AMD, Bromium, CA Technologies, Calxeda, Cisco, Citrix, Google, Intel, Oracle, Samsung, and Verizon. The Xen project itself is self-governing.

Since version 3.0 of the Linux kernel, Xen support for dom0 and domU exists in the mainline kernel.

Release history

Uses 

Internet hosting service companies use hypervisors to provide virtual private servers. Amazon EC2 (since August 2006), IBM SoftLayer, Liquid Web, Fujitsu Global Cloud Platform, Linode, OrionVM and Rackspace Cloud use Xen as the primary VM hypervisor for their product offerings.

Virtual machine monitors (also known as hypervisors) also often operate on mainframes and large servers running IBM, HP, and other systems.
Server virtualization can provide benefits such as:
 Consolidation leading to increased utilization
 Rapid provisioning
 Dynamic fault tolerance against software failures (through rapid bootstrapping or rebooting)
 Hardware fault tolerance (through migration of a virtual machine to different hardware)
 Secure separations of virtual operating systems
 Support for legacy software as well as new OS instances on the same computer

Xen's support for virtual machine live migration from one host to another allows load balancing and the avoidance of downtime.

Virtualization also has benefits when working on development (including the development of operating systems): running the new system as a guest avoids the need to reboot the physical computer whenever a bug occurs. Sandboxed guest systems can also help in computer-security research, allowing study of the effects of some virus or worm without the possibility of compromising the host system.

Finally, hardware appliance vendors may decide to ship their appliance running several guest systems, so as to be able to execute various pieces of software that require different operating systems.

Types of virtualization 

Xen offers five approaches to running the guest operating system:

 PV (paravirtualization): Virtualization-aware Guest and devices.
 HVM (hardware virtual machine): Fully hardware-assisted virtualization with emulated devices.
 HVM with PV drivers: Fully hardware-assisted virtualization with PV drivers for IO devices.
 PVHVM (paravirtualization with hardware virtualization): PV supported hardware-assisted virtualization with PV drivers for IO devices.
 PVH (PV in an HVM container): Fully paravirtualized Guest accelerated by hardware-assisted virtualization where available.

Xen provides a form of virtualization known as paravirtualization, in which guests run a modified operating system. The guests are modified to use a special hypercall ABI, instead of certain architectural features. Through paravirtualization, Xen can achieve high performance even on its host architecture (x86) which has a reputation for non-cooperation with traditional virtualization techniques. Xen can run paravirtualized guests ("PV guests" in Xen terminology) even on CPUs without any explicit support for virtualization. Paravirtualization avoids the need to emulate a full set of hardware and firmware services, which makes a PV system simpler to manage and reduces the attack surface exposed to potentially malicious guests. On 32-bit x86, the Xen host kernel code runs in Ring 0, while the hosted domains run in Ring 1 (kernel) and Ring 3 (applications).

CPUs that support virtualization make it possible to run unmodified guests, including proprietary operating systems (such as Microsoft Windows). This is known as hardware-assisted virtualization, however, in Xen this is known as hardware virtual machine (HVM). HVM extensions provide additional execution modes, with an explicit distinction between the most-privileged modes used by the hypervisor with access to the real hardware (called "root mode" in x86) and the less-privileged modes used by guest kernels and applications with "hardware" accesses under complete control of the hypervisor (in x86, known as "non-root mode"; both root and non-root mode have Rings 0–3). Both Intel and AMD have contributed modifications to Xen to exploit their respective Intel VT-x and AMD-V architecture extensions. Use of ARM v7A and v8A virtualization extensions came with Xen 4.3. HVM extensions also often offer new instructions to allow direct calls by a paravirtualized guest/driver into the hypervisor, typically used for I/O or other operations needing high performance. These allow HVM guests with suitable minor modifications to gain many of the performance benefits of paravirtualized I/O. In current versions of Xen (up to 4.2) only fully virtualized HVM guests can make use of hardware facilities for multiple independent levels of memory protection and paging. As a result, for some workloads, HVM guests with PV drivers (also known as PV-on-HVM, or PVH) provide better performance than pure PV guests. Xen HVM has device emulation based on the QEMU project to provide I/O virtualization to the virtual machines. The system emulates hardware via a patched QEMU "device manager" (qemu-dm) daemon running as a backend in dom0. This means that the virtualized machines see an emulated version of a fairly basic PC. In a performance-critical environment, PV-on-HVM disk and network drivers are used during the normal guest operation, so that the emulated PC hardware is mostly used for booting.

Features 

Administrators can "live migrate" Xen virtual machines between physical hosts across a LAN without loss of availability. During this procedure, the LAN iteratively copies the memory of the virtual machine to the destination without stopping its execution. The process requires a stoppage of around 60–300 ms to perform final synchronization before the virtual machine begins executing at its final destination, providing an illusion of seamless migration. Similar technology can serve to suspend running virtual machines to disk, "freezing" their running state for resumption at a later date.

Xen can scale to 4095 physical CPUs, 256 VCPUs per HVM guest, 512 VCPUs per PV guest, 16 TB of RAM per host, and up to 1 TB of RAM per HVM guest or 512 GB of RAM per PV guest.

Availability 

The Xen hypervisor has been ported to a number of processor families:
 Intel: IA-32, IA-64 (before version 4.2), x86-64
 PowerPC: previously supported under the XenPPC project, no longer active after Xen 3.2
 ARM: previously supported under the XenARM project for older versions of ARM without virtualization extensions, such as the Cortex-A9. Currently supported since Xen 4.3 for newer versions of the ARM with virtualization extensions, such as the Cortex-A15.
 MIPS: XLP832 experimental port

Hosts 
Xen can be shipped in a dedicated virtualization platform, such as XCP-ng or Citrix Hypervisor (formerly Citrix XenServer, and before that XenSource's XenEnterprise).

Alternatively, Xen is distributed as an optional configuration of many standard operating systems. Xen is available for and distributed with:
 Alpine Linux offers a minimal dom0 system (Busybox, UClibc) that can be run from removable media, like USB sticks.
 Arch Linux provides the necessary packages with detailed setup instructions on their Wiki.
 Debian Linux (since version 4.0 "etch") and many of its derivatives;
 FreeBSD 11 includes experimental host support.
 Gentoo has the necessary packages available to support Xen, along with instructions on their Wiki.
 Mageia (since version 4);
 NetBSD can function as domU and dom0.
 OpenSolaris-based distributions can function as dom0 and domU from Nevada build 75 onwards.
 openSUSE 10.x to 12.x: only 64-bit hosts are supported since 12.1;
 Qubes OS uses Xen to isolate applications for a more secure desktop.
 SUSE Linux Enterprise Server (since version 10);
 Solaris (since 2013 with Oracle VM Server for x86, before with Sun xVM);
 Ubuntu (since 8.04 "Hardy Heron", but no dom0-capable kernel in 8.10 "Intrepid Ibex" until 12.04 "Precise Pangolin".)

Guests 

Guest systems can run fully virtualized (which requires hardware support), paravirtualized (which requires a modified guest operating system), or fully virtualized with paravirtualized drivers (PVHVM). Most operating systems which can run on PCs can run as a Xen HVM guest. The following systems can operate as paravirtualized Xen guests:
 Linux
 FreeBSD in 32-bit, or 64-bit through PVHVM;
 OpenBSD, through PVHVM;
 NetBSD
 MINIX
 GNU Hurd (gnumach-1-branch-Xen-branch)
 Plan 9 from Bell Labs

Xen version 3.0 introduced the capability to run Microsoft Windows as a guest operating system unmodified if the host machine's processor supports hardware virtualization provided by Intel VT-x (formerly codenamed Vanderpool) or AMD-V (formerly codenamed Pacifica). During the development of Xen 1.x, Microsoft Research, along with the University of Cambridge Operating System group, developed a port of Windows XP to Xen — made possible by Microsoft's Academic Licensing Program. The terms of this license do not allow the publication of this port, although documentation of the experience appears in the original Xen SOSP paper. James Harper and the Xen open-source community have started developing free software paravirtualization drivers for Windows. These provide front-end drivers for the Xen block and network devices and allow much higher disk and network performance for Windows systems running in HVM mode. Without these drivers all disk and network traffic has to be processed through QEMU-DM. Subsequently, Citrix has released under a BSD license (and continues to maintain) PV drivers for Windows.

Management 

Third-party developers have built a number of tools (known as Xen Management Consoles) to facilitate the common tasks of administering a Xen host, such as configuring, starting, monitoring and stopping of Xen guests. Examples include:

 The OpenNebula cloud management toolkit
 On openSUSE YaST and virt-man offer graphical VM management
 OpenStack natively supports Xen as a Hypervisor/Compute target
 Apache CloudStack also supports Xen as a Hypervisor
 Novell's PlateSpin Orchestrate also manages Xen virtual machines for Xen shipping in SUSE Linux Enterprise Server.
 Xen Orchestra for both XCP-ng and Citrix Hypervisor platforms

Commercial versions 
 XCP-ng (Open Source, within the Linux Foundation and Xen Project, originally a fork of XenServer)
 Citrix Hypervisor (formerly XenServer until 2019) 
 Huawei FusionSphere
 Oracle VM Server for x86
 Thinsy Corporation
 Virtual Iron (discontinued by Oracle)
 Crucible (hypervisor) by Star Lab Corp.

The Xen hypervisor is covered by the GNU General Public Licence, so all of these versions contain a core of free software with source code. However, many of them contain proprietary additions.

See also 

 CloudStack
 Kernel-based Virtual Machine (KVM)
 OpenStack
 Virtual disk image
 tboot, a TXT-based integrity system for the Linux kernel and Xen hypervisor
 VMware ESX
 Qubes OS

References

Further reading 
 Paul Venezia (April 13, 2011) Virtualization shoot-out: Citrix, Microsoft, Red Hat, and VMware. The leading server virtualization contenders tackle InfoWorld's ultimate virtualization challenge, InfoWorld

External links 

 

2003 software
Citrix Systems
Cross-platform free software
Free virtualization software
Linux Foundation projects
University of Cambridge Computer Laboratory
Virtualization software for Linux